sbX is a bus rapid transit (BRT) service in San Bernardino and Loma Linda, California, United States. It is operated by Omnitrans, a public transportation agency in southwestern San Bernardino County. The route is internally named by Omnitrans as the Green Line.

sbX is intended to be a brand of bus rapid transit service that will eventually traverse major surface streets throughout Omnitrans' service area.

The Institute for Transportation and Development Policy (ITDP), under its BRT Standard, has given the sbX corridor a Bronze ranking.

Development 
Construction was set to finish in late 2013, but was pushed back due to ongoing construction at San Bernardino's downtown transit center. Service began in April 2014.

Omnitrans has begun making upgrades to its East Valley vehicle maintenance facility in San Bernardino, including modifications to its parking lot, service bays, bus wash, and fueling facility, to accommodate 60-foot buses, all of which have been purchased and acquired, to run on the sbX bus rapid transit (BRT) corridor.

Omnitrans has received a grant from the Federal Transit Administration to conduct an alternatives analysis for the Holt Boulevard/4th Street Corridor and the cities of Ontario and Fontana are both conducting studies on the feasibility of bus rapid transit along the corridor in their cities. Additionally, planners in Rancho Cucamonga are exploring recommendations on how to support high-density, transit-oriented development along the Foothill Boulevard corridor (Historic Route 66).

Stations

Artwork 
The CSUSB station is popular with students and staff who commute to the university because of the high cost and low availability of parking around campus. In 2008, the Omnitrans Transit Development Board began developing plans for a bus rapid line connecting CSUSB and Loma Linda University. Construction of the line began with construction of the Palm station and-neo the CSUSB Transit Center. The station was designed by Gruen Associates of Los Angeles for Omnitrans and the local community. Main artwork is by Freya Bardell and Brian Howe. The station art will be based on the trees on campus; the trees on glass will have a rich blue color that dramatically contrasts surroundings. Some artwork on the station was designed with help by CSUSB students and faculty that reflects the university community at large.

References

External links 
 

Bus rapid transit in California
Public transportation in San Bernardino County, California
Transportation in San Bernardino, California
Loma Linda, California
2014 establishments in California